The 1976 FA Charity Shield was a football match played between Liverpool, as English First Division Champions in the 1975/76 season, and Second Division  Southampton, as English FA Cup winners in 1976.

The match was played at Wembley Stadium, London, on Saturday 14 August 1976, in front of a crowd of 76,500.

The match was won by Liverpool 1–0 through a goal scored by John Toshack in the 50th minute with a right-foot shot from the edge of the penalty area after the ball was headed down to him by Kevin Keegan.

Match details

References 

1976
Charity Shield 1976
Charity Shield 1976
Charity Shield
Fa Charity Shield
Fa Charity Shield